Aurel Schmidt (born 1982) is a Canadian artist who lives and works in New York.

Work
Schmidt is primarily known for her drawings, but has also done work involving sculpture, assemblage and installation. She was included in the 2010 Whitney Biennial, and her work is included in the permanent collection of the Whitney Museum of American Art.

References

1982 births
Living people
21st-century Canadian artists
Canadian women artists